Jean-Pierre Léaud, ComM (born 28 May 1944) is a French actor, known for playing Antoine Doinel in François Truffaut's series of films about that character, beginning with The 400 Blows (1959). He also worked several times with Jean-Luc Godard and Aki Kaurismäki, as well as with other notable directors such as Jean Cocteau, Pier Paolo Pasolini, Bernardo Bertolucci, Catherine Breillat, Jerzy Skolimowski, Agnès Varda, Jacques Rivette, etc. He is a significant figure of the French New Wave.

Early life

Born in Paris, Léaud made his major debut as an actor at the age of 14 as Antoine Doinel, a semi-autobiographical character based on the life events of French film director François Truffaut, in The 400 Blows. To cast the two central characters, Antoine Doinel and his partner-in-crime René Bigey, Truffaut published an announcement in France-Soir and auditioned several hundred children in September and October 1958. Jean Domarchi, a critic at Cahiers du cinéma, had earlier recommended the son of an assistant scriptwriter, Pierre Léaud, and the actress Jacqueline Pierreux. Patrick Auffay was cast as René.

Truffaut was immediately captivated by the fourteen-year-old Léaud, who had already appeared with Jean Marais in Georges Lampin's La Tour, prends garde ! (1958). He recognized traits they both shared, "for example a certain suffering with regard to the family...With, however, this fundamental difference: though we were both rebels, we hadn't expressed our rebellion in the same way. I preferred to cover up and lie. Jean-Pierre, on the contrary, seeks to hurt, shock and wants it to be known...Why? Because he's unruly, while I was sly. Because his excitability requires that things happen to him, and when they don't occur quickly enough, he provokes them". In his final interview, Truffaut mentioned he was happy with how Léaud improvised within the flexibly written script.

Jean-Pierre Léaud, then in the eighth grade at a private school in Pontigny, was a far from ideal student. The director of the school wrote this to Truffaut, "I regret to inform you that Jean-Pierre is more and more 'unmanageable'. Indifference, arrogance, permanent defiance, lack of discipline in all its forms. He has twice been caught leafing through pornographic pictures in the dorm. He is developing more and more into an emotionally disturbed case". But this unstable boy, who often ran away with the older students on their nights out, could also be brilliant, generous, and affectionate. Extremely cultured for his age, he was already very good at writing, and he even claimed to Truffaut that he had written a "verse tragedy", Torquatus.

Truffaut's influence from adolescence into adulthood

Throughout the production of The 400 Blows (Les Quatre Cents Coups, 1959), wrote Jay Carr "Truffaut would take Léaud to see rushes of Godard's Breathless each evening. They'd sit up late talking film with Godard, Rivette, Rohmer, Eustache, Orson Welles." Upon the filmmaker's death, the actor reminisced Truffaut was the first person he admired and that he "spoke to children like they were adults. He realized that children understood things better than adults did. He was purely intuitive. We operated in a sort of complicity."

During and following the filming of The 400 Blows, Truffaut's concern for Léaud extended beyond the film set. He took charge of the difficult adolescent's upbringing after Léaud was expelled from school and kicked out of the home of the retired couple taking care of him. Truffaut subsequently rented a studio apartment for Léaud. Truffaut also hired him for assistant work on The Soft Skin (La peau douce, 1964) and Mata Hari, Agent H21 (1964).

Acting career

Léaud starred in four more Truffaut films depicting the life of Doinel, spanning a period of 20 years—after the short-film Antoine et Colette in 1962—beside actress Claude Jade as his girlfriend, and then wife, Christine. Those films are Stolen Kisses (1968), Bed and Board (1970) and Love on the Run (1979). Truffaut stated that Léaud was the source of inspiration for the Antoine Doinel character and "I created some scenes just because I knew he would be funny in them—at least I laughed during the writing as I thought of him." He also collaborated with Truffaut on non-Antoine Doinel films like Two English Girls (Les Deux Anglaises et le Continent, 1971) and Day for Night (La Nuit américaine, 1973) and became the actor most commonly affiliated with him. Although Antoine Doinel is his most familiar character, he often found his performances in other films to be compared to his Doinel character whether there were legitimate similarities or not.

Léaud is one of the most visible and well-known actors to be associated with the French New Wave film movement and, aside from his work with Truffaut, collaborated with Jean-Luc Godard (nine films), Jean Eustache, Jacques Rivette and Agnès Varda. The early 1970s was perhaps the peak of his professional career when he had three critically acclaimed films released: Bertolucci's Last Tango in Paris (1972), Truffaut's La Nuit américaine, and Eustache's The Mother and the Whore (both 1973). In the Bertolucci film, Léaud appeared in the same film as a hero of his, Marlon Brando, although the two men never met, since all of Léaud's scenes were shot on Saturdays and Brando refused to work on Saturdays.

In March 1966, Léaud won the Silver Bear for Best Actor at the 16th Berlin International Film Festival for his role in Jean-Luc Godard's Masculin, féminin. He was nominated for a César Award for Best Supporting Actor in 1988 for Les Keufs and was awarded an Honorary César for lifetime achievement in 2000.

Léaud acted in films by other influential directors, such as Pier Paolo Pasolini, Jerzy Skolimowski, Aki Kaurismäki and Olivier Assayas and Tsai Ming-liang.

Personal life

He is married to the French actress Brigitte Duvivier.

Honours and awards

Awards
 (1961) Nominated for the BAFTA Film Award for being the "Most Promising Newcomer to Leading Film Roles" for his role in The 400 Blows (1959).
 (1966) Won the Silver Bear for Best Actor at the Berlin International Film Festival for his role in Masculin Féminin.
 (1987) Nominated for César Award for Best Supporting Actor at the César Awards for his role in the film Les keufs.
 (1996) Won "Best Actor" at the Thessaloniki Film Festival for his role in 
 (2000) Received the Honorary César at the César Awards.
 (2001) Shared the FIPRESCI Prize with Bertrand Bonello for his role in The Pornographer.
 (2016) Received the Honorary Palme d'Or at the 2016 Cannes Film Festival
 (2017) Won the Lumières Award for Best Actor for his role in The Death of Louis XIV.

Honours
  Commander of the Order of Merit, Portugal (12 January 2017)

Selected filmography

References

External links 

 
 Biography on newwavefilm.com
 
 List of honors and awards

1944 births
Living people
20th-century French male actors
21st-century French male actors
Male actors from Paris
French male film actors
French male child actors
César Honorary Award recipients
Best Actor Lumières Award winners
Silver Bear for Best Actor winners